The inaugural Women's Volleyball Tournament in the Summer Olympic Games was held during Olympic Games of Tokyo, from October 11 to October 23, 1964. Japan won the gold medal, with the Soviet Union and Poland taking silver and bronze, respectively.

Qualification

*North Korea did not send athletes to the Olympic Games due to bad relations with Japan.

Format
The tournament was played in a single round-robin format, all teams were placed into a single pool and faced each other once.

Rosters

Venues
Komazawa Volleyball Courts in Tokyo
Yokohama Cultural Gymnasium in Yokohama

Round robin
All times are Japan Standard Time (UTC+09:00).

|}

Final standings

Medalists

Gallery

References

External links
 Brazilian site with full results
 Official results (pgs. 621, 656-668)
 Video of the moments of victory and of awarding gold medal in 1964 Tokyo Olympics

1964
O
Women's volleyball in Japan
1964 in Japanese women's sport
Vol

bs:Odbojka na OI 1964.
de:Olympische Sommerspiele 1964/Volleyball
es:Voleibol en los Juegos Olímpicos de Tokyo 1964
fr:Volley-ball aux Jeux olympiques de 1964
hr:Odbojka na OI 1964.
nl:Olympische Zomerspelen 1964/Volleybal
pt:Voleibol nos Jogos Olímpicos de Verão de 1964